Mabel Luella Bourne Bassett (August 16, 1876 – August 2, 1953) was a Democratic Oklahoma politician who served as the state's Commissioner of Charities and Corrections from 1923 until 1947.

Early life 
Mabel Bourne was born in Chicago, the daughter of Stephen Bourne and Martha E. Yourlin Bourne. She graduated from high school in Billings, Montana. She lived in Trinidad, Colorado as a young woman, and moved to Sapulpa, Oklahoma in 1902. She took courses at the Missouri School of Social Work in St. Louis.

Career 
Prior to seeking political office, Bassett founded the Creek County Humane Society, one of the first humane societies in Oklahoma. During World War I, she was executive secretary of the Creek County Red Cross.

Once in office as Commissioner of Charities and Corrections, Bassett was responsible for establishing a women's unit of the Oklahoma State Penitentiary and transferring African-American juvenile delinquents from the state penitentiary to a training school in Boley. In 1923, she issued a report on abusive and negligent conditions at the Pauls Valley Training School, a juvenile detention facility. "The people of Oklahoma want the truth," she said of her reform campaign. "They do not want their little boys flogged by drunken guards and I shall see that it is stopped, regardless of what is thrown in my path." In 1936, she investigated the death of an 11-year-old boy who died attempting to escape a fourth-floor jail cell in Stillwater.

Bassett also campaigned for a seat in the U.S. House of Representatives in 1932; however, she lost to fellow Democrat Will Rogers. She ran for a Congressional seat again in 1940. Buck Cook replaced Bassett as Commissioner of Charities and Corrections in 1947, at which point Bassett retired from politics, and ran a cattle farm in Guthrie, Oklahoma.

From 1930 to 1931, Bassett was vice-president of the American Prison Association.

Personal life, death, and legacy 
Bourne married train conductor Joseph L. Bassett in 1890, and had three children. Her daughter died in 1935. Upon her Bassett's death from cancer in 1953, in Oklahoma City, her body lay in state in the Oklahoma State Capitol. Oklahoma's Mabel Bassett Correctional Center is named for Bassett.

Notes

References

1876 births
1953 deaths
People from Sapulpa, Oklahoma
Women in Oklahoma politics
Heads of Oklahoma state agencies
Oklahoma Democrats